Marlborough is a rural town and coastal locality in the Livingstone Shire, Queensland, Australia.

Geography 
The town is a small service centre for the surrounding area, and one of a number of fuelling points on an otherwise isolated stretch of highway.

To the south lies the Kunwarara Magnesite mine, which works one of the world's largest supplies of the mineral.

Marlborough is famous for producing the world's finest chrysoprase, a semi-precious gem once coveted by Alexander the Great and Cleopatra.

The Bruce Highway passes through the locality, entering from the east (Kunwarara) and exiting to the north-west (Ogmore), bypassing the town approx  to the west. The North Coast railway line also passes through the locality, running roughly parallel to the east of the highway, but does pass through the town, which is served by Marlborough railway station .

History
Marlborough was established as a squatting pastoral run in 1857 by Dan Connor. The name is probably connected with the First Duke of Marlborough (1650-1722), a British army commander.

The post office at Marlborough opened on 1 January 1861. The first town allotments were sold in 1862. Marlborough was the location of a Native Police barracks from 1865 to 1876. The barracks were located at Barrack Creek on the northwest outskirts of the town.

Marlborough Railway Provisional School opened on 26 July 1917. On 26 April 1919 it was renamed Koonama Provisional School. On 18 October 1920 it became Koonama State School. On 11 September 1925 it was renamed Marlborough State School.

On 24 July 2000, five people were killed when the Rockhampton-based Capricorn Helicopter Rescue Service helicopter crashed in a paddock at Marlborough while attempting to land in thick fog. Following the tragedy, the community of Marlborough raised enough money to establish a permanent helipad in the town in an attempt to prevent a similar tragedy from occurring in the future.

Marlborough is within the local government area of Shire of Livingstone, but, between 2008 and 2013, it was within the Rockhampton Region.

Education 

Marlborough State School is a government primary (Early Childhood-6) school for boys and girls at Magog Road. In 2018, the school had an enrolment of 34 students with 5 teachers (3 full-time equivalent) and 6 non-teaching staff (3 full-time equivalent). The school competes against otherschools in the area such as Clarke Creek State School, Milman State School  and School of Distance Education. They compete in swimming and athletic carnivals which Marlborough normally hosts, having a 16-metre pool and a grassy oval.

There is no secondary school in Marlborough. Distance education and boarding schools would be other options.

Amenities 
Livingstone Shire Council operates a weekly library service at Marlborough. It is located at 15 Milman Street in the Marlborough Historical Museum building.

All Saints Anglican Church is at 27 Milman Street. It is part of the Parish of North Rockhampton (also known as the All Saints Anglican Community) within the Anglican Church of Central Queensland.

Attractions 

Marlborough Historical Museum is at 15 Milman Street. It collects and presents the natural and social heritage of Marlborough.

References

External links 

 

Towns in Queensland
Populated places established in 1856
Shire of Livingstone
Localities in Queensland